Brenda Fruhvirtová (born 2 April 2007) is a Czech tennis player.

Fruhvirtová has a career-high ITF Junior ranking of world No. 4, achieved on 13 December 2021.

Early life and background
Born in Prague, the capital of the Czech Republic, Brenda is the younger sister of fellow professional tennis player Linda Fruhvirtová.
The Fruhvirtová sisters have been training at the Mouratoglou Tennis Academy in Southern France since 2017, and are recipients of the Patrick Mouratoglou foundation.

Junior career
In 2018, Fruhvirtová won the U12 Eddie Herr tournament. She was ten years old when she won the title.

In April 2019, Brenda won the 2019 Trnava Cup U14 single title.

In 2019, Brenda and her sister Linda Fruhvirtová won the Petits As doubles title together with Linda also winning the singles title; one year later Brenda won the singles title. The Fruhvirtová sisters became the first members of the same family to win the title two years in a row.

In July 2020, Fruhvirtová defeated world No. 54, Kateřina Siniaková, during an exhibition tournament in the Czech Republic. A few weeks later, Fruhvirtová was invited to participate in the Ultimate Tennis Showdown (UTS) at the Mouratoglou Academy. She was one of the four players to compete in the first women's edition UTS, and lost to Alizé Cornet.

In September 2020, she received a wildcard by the French Tennis Federation to compete in the girls' singles draw at the French Open. She was the youngest player to play in the event (13 years old).

Professional career

2021: Professional debut
Brenda made her professional debut at the WTA 125 tournament in Seoul in December, where she won a round to earn her a WTA ranking.

2022: Eight titles on the ITF Circuit, top 200 & WTA Tour debut
At 14 years, 10 months and four days, Fruhvirtová became the youngest ITF Circuit champion, claiming her first title at the $25k Tucuman event in Argentina, since American Claire Liu, then 14 years, 9 months old, won a $10k event in Orlando in 2015. She won a second title in Tucuman the following week. Fruhvirtová made her WTA Tour debut after being awarded a wildcard into the Abierto Zapopan qualifying draw; she defeated former world No. 5, Sara Errani, and Leonie Küng to reach the main draw and make her WTA Tour debut, where she lost in straight sets to the sixth seed and former world No. 3, Sloane Stephens.

2023: Grand Slam debut
She qualified for her first major on her qualifying debut at the 2023 Australian Open. As the youngest player in the top 250, she became the fifth-youngest qualifier in Australian Open history and the youngest since Marta Kostyuk in 2018.

Performance timelines

Singles
Current after the 2023 Australian Open.

ITF finals

Singles: 9 (9 titles)

Doubles: 1 (title)

Longest winning streak

27-match win streak (2022)

Head-to-head records

Double bagel matches

References

Notes

External links
 
 

2007 births
Living people
Czech female tennis players
Tennis players from Prague
21st-century Czech women